Renty is a commune in the Pas-de-Calais department in the Hauts-de-France region of France.

Geography
Renty lies about 13 miles (21 km) southwest of Saint-Omer, on the D129 road, by the banks of the river Aa.

Population

Places of interest
 Two churches, dating from the seventeenth century.
 The ruins of the castle of Renty, destroyed in 1638.

The Battle of Renty (August 13th, 1554)
Henry II of France inherited his father's fight against Charles Quint. After the failure of a peace trip to Germany, his armies occupied Metz, Toul and Verdun in order to consolidate the north-east border of France. In June 1554, Renty, a small village with a solid castle was in the hands of Spanish imperial troops. 
At noon, the French artillery began firing at Renty Castle. The siege lasted until August 15. 
The castle was restored in 1630 but was destroyed eight years later in August 1638, during the Thirty Years War, by Marshal Châtillon.

There are still traces of the feudal motte in the centre of the village.

See also
Communes of the Pas-de-Calais department

References

External links

 Château de Renty – fishing and history 

Communes of Pas-de-Calais